Pterygoid nerve may refer to:

 Medial pterygoid nerve
 Lateral pterygoid nerve